Wild Eyes Productions is an American production company located in Hermosa Beach, California.

It was founded in 2001 by David Keane and his wife Arcadia Berjonneau, with the release of The True Story of Black Hawk Down the highest rated documentary to air on History Channel at the time. Working with bestselling authors such as Mark Bowden and Dean King Wild Eyes has produced content in 77 countries on six continents.

Television

References

External links
 

Hermosa Beach, California
Mass media companies established in 2001
Companies based in Los Angeles County, California
Film production companies of the United States